The History of Independent Cinema is a 2009 book by film historian Phil Hall.

Summary
It traces the development of the United States independent film sector from silent films to digital media.  The book also focuses on independent film genres including documentary films, race films, Yiddish-language films and corporate sponsored films.

Publication history

See also
L.A. Rebellion-covered in the book
John Cassavetes-covered in the book
Midnight movie
B movie
Sundance Film Festival

References

Books about film
2009 non-fiction books